Léo Laporte-Blairsy (1865-1923) was a French sculptor.

References

1865 births
1923 deaths
Sculptors from Toulouse
French male sculptors